Kilembe Mines Hospital, is a community hospital in the Western Region of Uganda.

Location
The coordinates of Kilembe Mines Hospital are:0°12'14.0"N, 30°00'37.0"E (Latitude:0.203885; Longitude:30.010271).

Overview
The hospital, being located on the banks of River Nyamwamba, is prone to flooding; having flooded in May 2013, in May 2014 and in July 2015.

Hospital profile
The hospital was established in 1951 to serve the staff of Kilembe Mines. It also caters for the hospital needs of the Kilembe community. The three major benefactors of Kilembe Mines Hospital are (a) the Government of Uganda (b) Kilembe Mines Limited and (c) the Roman Catholic Diocese of Kasese. It as capacity of 200 beds.

See also
Kasese
List of hospitals in Uganda

References

External links
 Website of Uganda Ministry of Health
 Kilembe mines back to life amidst poor pay concerns - 23 September 2015
 Visiting The Kilembe Mines Hospital - My First Field Visit In Uganda

Hospitals established in 1951
Hospitals in Uganda
Kasese District
Rwenzururu sub-region
Western Region, Uganda
1951 establishments in Uganda